Gregory Alexander Van Pelt (born May 1, 1970) is an American football coach and former player who is the offensive coordinator for the Cleveland Browns of the National Football League (NFL). He previously served as an assistant coach for the Cincinnati Bengals, Green Bay Packers, Tampa Bay Buccaneers and Buffalo Bills.

Playing career

College
Van Pelt attended the University of Pittsburgh, where he was a quarterback for the Panthers. When he graduated, Van Pelt held school passing records previously set by Dan Marino. His single-season mark of 3,163 passing yards in 1992 was broken in 2003 by Rod Rutherford.

1989: 192/347 for 2,881 yards with 17 touchdowns vs 12 interceptions.  Ran for 4 touchdowns.
1990: 201/351 for 2,427 yards with 14 touchdowns vs 17 interceptions.  Ran for 2 touchdowns.
1991: 227/398 for 2,796 yards with 15 touchdowns vs 14 interceptions.  Ran for 1 touchdown.
1992: 245/407 for 3,163 yards with 20 touchdowns vs 17 interceptions.

Professional
Van Pelt was an eighth round draft pick of his hometown Pittsburgh Steelers, but was released during training camp. Van Pelt spent three games with the Kansas City Chiefs late in the 1993 NFL season following a hamstring injury to Joe Montana. He was re-signed by the Chiefs prior to the 1994 NFL season, but was released during training camp. He was signed by the Buffalo Bills later in the 1994 season following a knee injury sustained by Jim Kelly and spent the remainder of his career as a backup with the Bills.

Van Pelt's first NFL win as a starter would come on November 2, 1997, against Dan Marino and the Miami Dolphins. In 2001, he started 8 games, going 2–6, and playing well enough to justify a contract extension that would allow the Bills to release failed Doug Flutie successor Rob Johnson. Van Pelt would not start any games after 2001 due to a Bills trade with the New England Patriots for Drew Bledsoe, who became the full-time starting quarterback. Van Pelt remained with the team as Bledsoe's backup for the next two seasons before retiring.

In his eleven-year career, Van Pelt totaled 16 touchdowns and 24 interceptions on 477 pass attempts in 31 career appearances and 11 starts.

Broadcasting career
After retiring from football in 2004, Van Pelt was John Murphy's partner on Bills Radio Network broadcasts. He did color commentary for the radio broadcast of all Bills games until the 2005 season.

Coaching career

University at Buffalo
Van Pelt was a volunteer winter quarterbacks coach for the University at Buffalo in 2005.

Frankfurt Galaxy
Van Pelt was the quarterbacks coach for the Frankfurt Galaxy of NFL Europe, the NFL's developmental league, in 2005, where he was responsible for all offensive play calling.

Buffalo Bills
On February 13, 2006, Van Pelt was hired by Buffalo Bills head coach Dick Jauron as offensive quality control coach. On January 16, 2008, the Bills promoted him to quarterbacks coach. On September 4, 2009, he was promoted again to offensive coordinator after Turk Schonert was fired.

On January 4, 2010, Van Pelt, along with the rest of the Bills coaching staff, was fired following a 6–10 season.

Tampa Bay Buccaneers
Van Pelt was hired by the Tampa Bay Buccaneers as the quarterbacks coach on February 1, 2010. When Buccaneers head coach Raheem Morris was fired on January 2, 2012, the whole staff was let go as well.

Green Bay Packers
Van Pelt was hired by the Packers as the running backs coach on February 13, 2012. On February 7, 2014, Van Pelt was promoted to quarterbacks coach and his contract expired on January 3, 2018.

Cincinnati Bengals
On January 12, 2018, Van Pelt was hired by the Cincinnati Bengals as their quarterbacks coach.

Cleveland Browns
On January 29, 2020, Van Pelt was hired by the Cleveland Browns as their offensive coordinator under head coach Kevin Stefanski. Stefanski missed the team's wild card playoff game against the Pittsburgh Steelers on January 10, 2021, and Van Pelt took over as offensive play caller for the game.

Personal life
Van Pelt lives in Cleveland, Ohio with his wife Brooke and their three children.

See also
List of Division I FBS passing yardage leaders

References

External links
 Packers bio
 

1970 births
Living people
American radio sports announcers
American football quarterbacks
Buffalo Bills announcers
Buffalo Bills coaches
Buffalo Bills players
Frankfurt Galaxy coaches
National Football League announcers
National Football League offensive coordinators
Pittsburgh Panthers football players
Tampa Bay Buccaneers coaches
Sportspeople from Pittsburgh
Players of American football from San Antonio
Sportspeople from San Antonio
Cleveland Browns coaches